This is an incomplete list of Filipino full-length films, both mainstream and independently produced, released in theaters and cinemas in 2021. Some films are in production but do not have definite release dates.

Top grossing films

The highest-grossing Filipino films released in 2021, by domestic box office gross revenue, are as follows:

Highest-grossing films of 2021

January–March

April–June

Color key

July–September

Color key

October–December

Color key

Awards

Local
The following list shows the Best Picture winners at the four major film awards: FAMAS Awards, Gawad Urian Awards, Luna Awards, and Star Awards; and at the three major film festivals: Metro Manila Film Festival, Cinemalaya, and Cinema One Originals.

References

External links
 

Philippines